Anthony Edwin Phillips (born 23 December 1951) is an English musician, songwriter, producer and singer who gained prominence as the original lead guitarist of the rock band Genesis, from 1967 to 1970. He left in July 1970 and learned to play more instruments, before he began a solo career. His departure from Genesis on the eve of the group's breakthrough to mainstream popularity has led him to be popularly dubbed "the Pete Best of progressive rock" (though unlike Best, Phillips left voluntarily).

Phillips released his first solo album, The Geese & the Ghost, in 1977. He continues to release solo material, including further solo albums, television and film music, collaborations with several artists, and compilation albums of his recordings.

Early life 
Phillips was born on 23 December 1951 in Chiswick, England. He attended a preparatory school, during which he formed a group and took part in a performance of "My Old Man's a Dustman" in the school hut as the singer, but forgot the words during it and was kicked out. This led to his decision to learn the guitar. He learned enough to perform lead guitar to a rendition of "Foot Tapper" by The Shadows in the school lounge. The Shadows were a major influence for Phillips in terms of acoustic guitar. At thirteen Phillips acquired a Stratocaster and wrote the basis of his first song, "Patricia", named after the first girl he liked. Part of the song was recorded later by Genesis on "In Hiding". He was not entirely a self-taught guitar player; he received some tuition in rudimentary chords from classical guitarist David Channon, who became a big source of inspiration for Phillips, and used sheet music to songs by The Beatles that his mother would send him. Phillips then picked up more chord knowledge, and learned to copy "reasonably well". As a teenager, Phillips briefly lived in the United States.

In April 1965, Phillips attended Charterhouse, an independent school in Godalming, Surrey. In the following month, he formed a band with fellow pupils Rivers Jobe, Richard Macphail, Mike Rutherford, and Rob Tyrell, naming themselves Anon. They based their sets on songs by The Beatles and The Rolling Stones and recorded one demo, Phillips's song "Pennsylvania Flickhouse". The group disbanded in December 1966.

Career

1967–1974: Genesis and hiatus 
In January 1967, after Anon had split up, Phillips and Rutherford became a songwriting unit and started recording several demos. They invited Charterhouse pupil Tony Banks, a member of Garden Wall, another disbanded school group, to play keyboards. Banks agreed, and suggested involving his Garden Wall bandmates, singer Peter Gabriel and drummer Chris Stewart. After the five made a demo tape, it was given to Jonathan King, who signed them to his publishing company and had them record some singles. He named the group Genesis, and suggested they record a studio album which became From Genesis to Revelation. Phillips was particularly angry when King added string arrangements to their songs without their knowledge.

In September 1969, the 17-year-old Phillips chose not to pursue a university degree and instead reunite with Gabriel, Banks and Rutherford after they had decided to become a full-time band. However, early in 1970 the constant touring had become wearing on Phillips partly due to the lack of scope for solos in the band's set and the shortage of time to develop new material. To further complicate matters he had developed stage fright which got progressively worse as time went on, and battled with it for three months thinking it was a passing phase. After falling ill with bronchial pneumonia, Phillips was advised by his doctor to quit the band.

In June 1970, Phillips had recovered enough to reunite with his bandmates and record their second album, Trespass. Despite his various problems at the time Phillips enjoyed the recording sessions. After recording finished in July the band resumed touring, though early into the tour Phillips announced his decision to leave. His final gig took place at Haywards Heath on 18 July. Banks and Rutherford later said that the group seriously considered disbanding altogether in the wake of Phillips's departure. Nursery Cryme, the next Genesis album, opens with "The Musical Box" which is based on a piece written by Phillips and Rutherford originally titled "F#" (pronounced "F Sharp").

After leaving Genesis, Phillips lacked a solid direction. He recalled listening to Jean Sibelius around the time of his departure and recognised his musical ability was "terribly limited", which encouraged him to become a more proficient musician. In 1974, he became a qualified music teacher and gave lessons to students. By 1977, he was playing classical guitar and piano, and studied orchestration.

1974–present: Solo career 
After leaving Genesis, Phillips studied classical music (especially classical guitar) and made recordings in collaboration with Harry Williamson, Mike Rutherford and Phil Collins, among others. His first solo album, The Geese & the Ghost, was issued in 1977.

Following the commercial failure of The Geese & the Ghost, Phillips was pushed in a pop direction by his record labels. They released his second album, Wise After the Event, in 1978. This was followed the next year by Sides. Both of these albums were produced by Rupert Hine and were intended to reach a mainstream audience, though neither album was successful in that regard.

In its initial release in the UK, Sides was accompanied by a more experimental album entitled Private Parts & Pieces; in the US and Canada the two albums were issued separately. Private Parts & Pieces II: Back to the Pavilion followed the next year, and several further sequels were issued in the 1980s and 1990s. According to Phillips, the series "arose partly out of poverty. I was just getting by, library music was just getting going. I had to issue a collection of twelve-string or solo-piano stuff to boost my income."

Phillips began writing material with Andrew Latimer of Camel in 1981, and was a featured performer on that band's album, The Single Factor (released in 1982).

Phillips released a mainstream pop album entitled Invisible Men in 1983. He later claimed that this project went "horribly wrong" as a result of commercial pressures, and would subsequently eschew mainstream success in favour of more specialised material. He co-wrote "Tears on the Ballroom Floor" for I Hear Talk by Bucks Fizz.

Since leaving Genesis, Phillips has remained involved in a variety of musical projects, including soundtrack work in England, often for the label Atmosphere, part of the Universal Music Group. In 1988 he recorded an album with Harry Williamson called Tarka. The album's cover featured a picture of a woman and did not credit Phillips or Williamson, which led to it often being filed under "female vocalist" in record shops. In the mid-1990s, he released an album entitled The Living Room Concert, which featured solo acoustic versions of his earlier material. He also provided archival material for the first Genesis box set, Genesis Archive 1967–75, released in 1998.

Several of his albums feature artwork by Peter Cross.

In 2008, the first Anthony Phillips biography, The Exile, by journalist Mario Giammetti, was published in Italy (Edizioni Segno). Harvest of the Heart, a 5-CD Box Set chronicling Phillips' solo career and collaborations, was released in 2014.

Discography

With Genesis
From Genesis to Revelation (1969)
Trespass (1970)
Genesis Archive 1967–75 (1998)
Genesis 1970–1975 (2008)
R-Kive (2015)

Solo albums

Compilations

Appears on

References

Sources

External links
 Anthony Phillips Official Site

1951 births
Living people
English rock guitarists
English male singers
English songwriters
Genesis (band) members
People educated at Charterhouse School
People from Chiswick
English classical guitarists
English male guitarists
Lead guitarists
Voiceprint Records artists